The 22nd Annual Tony Awards was held on April 21, 1968, at the Shubert Theatre and broadcast on television by NBC. Hosts were Angela Lansbury and Peter Ustinov, assisted by Jack Benny and with Alfred Drake doing narration.

The ceremony
The theme of this year's awards ceremony was to salute previous Tony Award-winning musicals.

Presenters: Anne Bancroft, Shirley Booth, Art Carney, Trudy Carson, Diahann Carroll, Carol Cole, Sandy Dennis, Audrey Hepburn, Jerry Herman, Anne Jackson, Alan King, Groucho Marx, Liza Minnelli, Paul Newman, Gregory Peck, Harold Prince, Tony Randall, Eli Wallach, Joanne Woodward.

Musicals represented: 
 Golden Rainbow ("Twenty-Four Hours a Day" - Company);
 The Happy Time ("The Happy Time"/"A Certain Girl" - Robert Goulet, David Wayne, Michael Rupert)
 Fiddler on the Roof ("Matchmaker, Matchmaker" - Tanya Everett, Bette Midler, Mimi Turque)
 Cabaret ("Cabaret" - Jill Haworth)
 Man of La Mancha ("The Impossible Dream" - David Atkinson)
 Hello, Dolly! ("Put on Your Sunday Clothes"/"So Long, Dearie" - Pearl Bailey and Company)
 How Now, Dow Jones ("Step to the Rear" - Tony Roberts and Company)
 Hallelujah, Baby! ("Smile, Smile" - Leslie Uggams, Lillian Hayman, Robert Hooks)

Award winners and nominees
Winners are in bold

Special awards
Audrey Hepburn
Carol Channing
Pearl Bailey
David Merrick
Maurice Chevalier
APA-Phoenix Theatre
Marlene Dietrich

Multiple nominations and awards

These productions had multiple nominations:

10 nominations: The Happy Time
9 nominations: Hallelujah, Baby!
8 nominations: Rosencrantz and Guildenstern Are Dead  
6 nominations: How Now, Dow Jones and Illya Darling    
4 nominations: A Day in the Death of Joe Egg  
3 nominations: Plaza Suite
2 nominations: The Birthday Party, Golden Rainbow, Henry, Sweet Henry, More Stately Mansions, The Price and You Know I Can't Hear You When the Water's Running

The following productions received multiple awards.

5 wins: Hallelujah, Baby! 
4 wins: Rosencrantz and Guildenstern Are Dead 
3 wins: The Happy Time

External links
Tony Awards official site

Tony Awards ceremonies
1968 in theatre
1968 awards in the United States
April 1968 events in the United States
1968 in New York City